Srirangapatna is a town and headquarters of one of the seven Taluks of Mandya district, in the Indian State of Karnataka. It gets its name from the Ranganthaswamy temple consecrated at around 984 CE. Later, under the British rule the city was renamed to Seringapatnam. Located near the city of Mandya, it is of religious, cultural and historic importance.

The monuments on the island town of Srirangapatna have been nominated as a UNESCO World Heritage Site, and the application is pending on the tentative list of UNESCO.

History
Srirangapatna has since time immemorial been an urban center and place of pilgrimage. During the Vijayanagar empire, it became the seat of a major viceroyalty, from where several nearby vassal states of the empire, such as Mysore and Talakad, were overseen. When perceiving the decline of the Vijayanagar empire, the rulers of Mysore ventured to assert independence, Srirangapatna was their first target. Raja Wodeyar I vanquished Rangaraya, the then viceroy of Srirangapatna, in 1610 and celebrated the Navaratri festival in the town that year. It came to be accepted in time that two things demonstrated control and signified sovereignty over the Kingdom of Mysore by any claimant to the throne, including the successful holding of the 10-day-long Navaratri festival, dedicated to Chamundeshwari, patron goddess of Mysore and control of the fort of Srirangapatna, the fortification nearest to the capital city of Mysore.

Srirangapatna remained part of the Kingdom of Mysore from 1610 to after India's independence in 1947; as the fortress closest to the capital city of Mysore, it was the last bastion and defence of the kingdom in case of invasion.

Hyder and Tipu

Srirangapatna became the capital of Mysore under Hyder Ali and Tipu Sultan. When Tipu finally dispensed with the charade of deference to the Wodeyar Maharaja who was actually his captive, and proclaimed the "Khudadad State" under his own kingship, though the then incumbent Wodeyar scion Chamaraja Wodeyar IX was still officially the king of Mysore.

During Tipu Sultan's wars against the British, Kodavas, and Malabar rajas; he rounded up entire communities of Nairs, Kodavas, and Mangalorean Catholics in the conquered regions and deported them to Srirangapatna, where they were held in bondage until they received freedom from captivity as a result of Tipu's defeat by the British in 1799.

Treaty of Seringapatam, 1792

The Treaty of Seringapatam (also called Srirangapatna), signed 18 March 1792, ended the Third Anglo-Mysore War. Its signatories included Lord Cornwallis on behalf of the British East India Company, representatives of the Nizam of Hyderabad and the Maratha Empire, and Tipu Sultan, the ruler of Mysore.

Battle of Seringapatam, 1799

Srirangapatna was the scene of the last and decisive battle of the Fourth Anglo-Mysore War, fought in 1799 between Tipu Sultan, ruler of Mysore, and a combined force of 50,000 men provided equally by the Nizam of Hyderabad and the East India Company, under the overall command of General George Harris.

At the battle's climax, Tipu Sultan was killed within the fort of Seringapatam, betrayed by one of his own confidants. The spot where he fell is today marked by a memorial. Although the joint forces of the victorious army plundered Seringapatam and ransacked Tipu's palace, much of the site of the battle is still intact, including the ramparts, the Water Gate, the area where British prisoners were held, and the site of the destroyed palace.

Apart from the usual gold and cash, innumerable other valuables were shipped to England, including objets d'art and personal possessions of Tipu Sultan such as his rich clothing, shoes, sword, and firearms. Most of these remain in the British Royal Collection and in the Victoria and Albert Museum, the latter of which holds Tipu's Tiger, an automaton of a tiger on top of a British soldier. The sword of Tipu Sultan was purchased at a Sotheby's auction by Vijay Mallya, a liquor baron from Karnataka.

British composer Harriet Wainwright composed a work for chorus ("Seringapatam") about the battle.

Location

Although situated only  from Mysore city, Srirangapatna lies in the neighbouring district of Mandya. The entire town is enclosed by the river Kaveri to form a river island, the northern half of which is shown in the adjacent image.  While the main river flows on the eastern side of the island, the Paschima Vaahini segment of the same river flows to its west. The town is easily accessible by train from Bengaluru and Mysore and is also well-connected by road, lying as it does just off the Bangalore-Mysore National Highway 275. The highway passes through this town and special care was taken to minimize any impact on the monuments.

Religious significance
The town takes its name from the celebrated Ranganathaswamy temple which dominates the town, making Srirangapatna one of the most important Vaishnavite centers of pilgrimage in South India. The temple was built by the Ganga dynasty rulers of the area in the 9th century; the structure was strengthened and improved upon architecturally some three centuries later. Thus, the temple is a medley of the Hoysala and Vijayanagar styles of temple architecture.

Tradition holds that all the islands formed in the Kaveri River are consecrated to Sri Ranganathaswamy (PrabhaVishnu mentioned in Vishnu SahasraNamah) and large temples have been built in very ancient times dedicated to that deity on the three largest islands. The Srirangapatna temple is one of the three temples of the God Ranganatha (Adi Ranga) that are situated in the natural islands formed in the Kaveri river. They are:

Adi Ranga: the Sri Ranganathaswamy Temple at Srirangapatna, Srirangapatna taluk, Mandya district, Karnataka, India
Madhya Ranga: the Sri Ranganathaswamy Temple at Shivanasamudra, Kollegala taluk, Chamarajanagara district, Karnataka, India
Antya Ranga: the Sri Ranganathaswamy Temple at Srirangam, Srirangam taluk, Tiruchirappalli district, Tamil Nadu, India

The presence of the Kaveri River is in itself considered auspicious and sanctifying. The Paschima Vaahini section of the Kaveri at Srirangapatna is considered especially sacred; the pious come from far and wide to immerse the ashes of the departed and perform obsequies to their ancestors in these waters.

Demographics
According to the 2011 India Census Data, Srirangapatna had a population of 155,130 persons. Males constitute 50.06% and females constitute 49.93% of the total population. 9.80% of the population are under 6 years of age.

Geography
It has an average elevation of 679 metres (2227 feet). Srirangapatna Sangama is the confluence of the three holy streams creating the island. Located 27 km upstream from the town is the spectacular Shivanasamudra Falls, the second biggest waterfall in India and the 16th largest in the world.

Places of interest

The town is famous for a very ancient temple dedicated to Sri Ranganathaswamy, a form of Lord Vishnu. There is also Kalyani Siddhi Vinayaka Temple in front of the Sri Ranganathaswamy Temple. Other temples in Srirangapatna include the Lakshminarasimha Swamy Temple, Jyothi Mahaswara Temple, Bidhcotta Ganesha Temple, Panduranga Swamy Temple, the Sathyanarayana Swamy Temple, the Anjunaya Swamy Temple, the Ayyapa Temple, the Gangadhareswara Swamy Temple, and RaganathaNagara Ganesha Temple, Lakshmi Temple, Sri Raghavendra Swamy Mutt on Old Post Office Road, surrounding Srirangapatna in fort 8 Ganesh & Anjunaya temples. The Karighatta (Black Hill) and its temple of Lord Srinivasa is a few kilometres from the town. The deity is Kari-giri-vasa (one who resides on the black hill). The renowned Nimishambha Temple is about 2 km from the town. Srirangapatna also hosts the summer palace of Tipu Sultan and his mausoleum.

Sri Ranganathaswamy Temple

The Ranganthaswamy Temple – usually referred to as "Sri Ranganathaswamy" – is dedicated to Ranganatha, a manifestation of Vishnu. It is one of the five important pilgrimage sites along the river Kaveri for devotees of Ranganatha. These five sacred sites are together known as Pancharanga Kshetrams in Southern India. Since Srirangapatna is the first temple starting from upstream, the deity is known as Adi Ranga (lit; "first Ranga"), and the town of Srirangapatna, which derives its name from the temple, is on an island in the river Kaveri.

Daria Daulat Bagh

The Dariya Daulat Palace (Summer Palace) is set amidst beautiful gardens called Daria Daulat Bagh. Tippu Sultan built this palace in 1784. The palace is built in the Indo-Saracenic style is mostly made of teakwood. The palace has a rectangular plan and is built on a raised platform.

Other attractions in Srirangapatna include the Jumma Masjid (a Mosque) and the Daria Daulat Gardens. The mosque has stone Arabic inscriptions which mention the 99 titles given to the almighty Allah, and the Farsi inscriptions which mentions that the Jamia Masjid called Masjid-E-Ala was built in AD 1782 by Tipu Sultan.

Tipu Sultan Gumbaz

The Gumbaz is an impeccably detailed mausoleum and houses the remains of Tipu Sultan, his father Hyder Ali and his mother Fatima Begum among beautifully manicured gardens. Various tombs of other relatives surround the gumbaz, some with small signs offering guidance on which specific individuals are buried here. The outer gumbaz columns are made of amphibolite, a very dark rock that exudes a somber richness. Handcrafted door frames covered in a deep lacquer finish lead into an inner tomb illuminated only by natural light. All visitors are welcome inside, and even encouraged to enter by the friendly doormen.

Wellesley Bridge
Wellesley Bridge was erected by Kingdom of Mysore's Dewan, Purnaiah on the Kaveri river in 1804. It was named after the then Governor General Marquis of Wellesley.  The bridge is built of stone pillars and stone corbels and surrounded by stone girders.  The bridge is very strong and has survived the heavy traffic of many years.

Karighatta viewpoint
The Karighatta viewpoint gives good panorama of Mysore and Srirangapatna cities from a height of 3,000 feet.  Karighatta is a hill a few kilometres outside the 'island' town of Srirangapatna. The name Karighatta translates to "Black Hill" in Kannada. The hill supports the dry scrub jungle and many tamarind and gooseberry trees are found around the temple. A small river, Lokapavani, a tributary of Kaveri flows by the hill. The main entrance to the temple, with huge wooden doors opens into a large quadrangle, which is the main shrine for Vaikunta Srinivasa in black stone, flanked by Yoga Srinivasa (without his consort) and Bhoga Srinivasa idols. The hill may be climbed by stone steps (450 in number). A winding paved road is used for vehicular transport. The stone steps lead to a flat hilltop where the temple stands. The hillock has a superb panoramic view of Srirangapatna and Mysore. The beautiful landscape around the hill and the confluence of the Kaveri and Lokapavani rivers can be seen from atop the hill.

Nimishamba Temple
The famous Nimishamba (the incarnation of Parvathi, the goddess wife of Lord Shiva) temple is on the bank of the Lokapavani river. This temple too can be clearly seen from the top of the Karighatta hill. It is a belief that Parvathi will clear all the problems and troubles of her devotees within a minute (nimisha in Sanskrit), and hence the name.

Garrison Cemetery, Srirangapatna

The Garrison Cemetery is located in Srirangapatna, on the banks of the river Cauvery, about 300m from the Bangalore Mysore Highway. It has about 307 graves of the European officers killed in the final assault on Tippu Sultan in 1799, and their family members. Among the graves, there are 80 graves of the officers of the Swiss Regiment de Meuron, and the rest of the graves are their family members.

Scott’s Bungalow, Seringapatam

The Scott’s Bungalow is located in Seringapatam on the banks of the river Cauvery, at about half a mile from the Mysore Gate of the Seringapatam gate. The bungalow was the residence of Col. Scott, an officer of the Madras Army who took part in the siege of Seringapatam in 1799. The bungalow is associated with the legend and tragedy of Col. Scott. The story of Scott’s Bungalow is lamented in a poem by Walter Yeldham called The Deserted Bungalow, published in 1875.

Lord Harris's House
Between the Garrison Cemetery and Scott’s Bungalow a path leads to Lord Harris's House on the river banks. This house is known as Lord Harris's House or The Doctor's Bungalow or Puraniah's Bungalow. This house was the residence of General Harris, for a short time after the siege of Seringapatam in 1799, and went on to become headquarters of the commanding officer of Seringapatam. In 1809, the house was the scene of a mutiny by officers of the Madras Army, led by Col. Bell, against Sir. George Barlow, the Governor of Madras. Purnaiah, lived in this house after his retirement from service in 1811, and died there on 28 March 1812. A tablet on the wall records the connection of Lord Harris and Puraniah to the house.

Srirangapatna Fort

The fortress is in the west of the island, and is surrounded by double walls. The point at which the British broke through the walls, and thus Tipu Sultan's troops surprised, is marked by an obelisk. Also highlighted is the place where Tipu Sultan was killed by the British forces. In addition, the dungeon in which the Mysore rulers had imprisoned British soldiers.

Colonel Bailey's Dungeon 

Colonel Bailey's Dungeon was the place where Tipu Sultan used to imprison all the British officers. It is near the death place memorial of Tipu Sultan and is surrounded by gardens on all four sides. Bailey was the only British officer who died in that place and could not make it through the tough conditions and so it was later named after him.

Another version says that the commanding officer of the British at the Battle of Pollilur (1780), Col. Baillie, was imprisoned here after the defeat of his troops in the First Mysore War.

Obelisk Monument 

Obelisk Monument|Obelisk in Srirangapatna}} is a memorial erected by the then government of Mysore in memory of the English soldiers died during the siege of Srirangapatna. The Memorial was built during the reign of Krishnaraja Wadiyar IV in 1907, to celebrate the defeat of Tipu in 1799. The inscription on the plaque reads "This monument is erected by the government of Mysore in 1907 in order to commemorate the siege of Seringapatam by the British forces under lieutenant general G. Harris ( George Harris, 1st Baron Harris ) and its final capture by assault on 4 May 1799. As also the names of those gallant officers who fell during the operations."

Ranganathittu Bird Sanctuary

Near the town is the Ranganathittu Bird Sanctuary, where several bird species breed, including the painted stork, open-billed stork, black-headed ibis, river tern, great stone plover and Indian shag.

In literature
 Bernard Cornwell's Sharpe's Tiger is a fictionalised account of the Battle of Seringapatam. It concentrates on the exploits of the fictional character of Richard Sharpe, and the historic Arthur Wellesley, later the Duke of Wellington.
 Wilkie Collins' The Moonstone includes a prologue that takes place during the Battle of Srirangapatna, entitled "The Storming of Seringapatam (1799)," during which a British officer steals a sacred Hindu diamond that becomes the mystery at the centre of the novel.
 John Forster mentions in The Life of Charles Dickens that in a childhood playground of C.D., "he had been... delivered from the dungeons of Seringapatam, an immense pile ('of haycock'), by the victorious British ('boy next door and his two cousins')..."  See pg. 10 of the Everyman edition published in 1969.  First published: London; Chapman and Hall, 1872–1874 in 3 volumes.

Image gallery

See also

 Karighatta Road
 Bannur
 Arakere
 Kodagahalli

References

External links

Ancient History of Srirangapatna
Srirangam Temple - Tamil Nadu
Srirangapatna - Mysore
Page on Srirangapatna at Kamat.com
"The Tiger and the Thistle"
Top things to do at Srirangapatna Karnataka

 
Cities and towns in Mandya district
Kingdom of Mysore
Hindu holy cities
Former capital cities in India
Landforms of Karnataka
Islands of Karnataka
Tourist attractions in Mandya district
River islands of India
Geography of Mandya district
Islands of India
Populated places in India